Akanthomyces aculeatus is a species of fungus belonging to the family Cordycipitaceae.

It is native to Europe and America.

References

Cordycipitaceae